This article lists heads of the New York State College of Forestry, both at Cornell University and later at Syracuse University; and its successor, the State University of New York College of Environmental Science and Forestry, in Syracuse, New York.

Deans 
 Bernhard Fernow, Dean, New York State College of Forestry at Cornell University, 1898–1903
 William L. Bray, Dean, New York State College of Forestry at Syracuse University, 1911–12
 Hugh P. Baker, Dean, New York State College of Forestry at Syracuse University, 1912–20
 F. Franklin Moon, Dean, New York State College of Forestry at Syracuse University, 1920–27
 Nelson C. Brown, Acting Dean, New York State College of Forestry at Syracuse University, 1927–30
 Hugh P. Baker, Dean, New York State College of Forestry at Syracuse University, 1930–33
 Samuel N. Spring, Dean, New York State College of Forestry at Syracuse University, 1933–44
 Joseph S. Illick, Dean, New York State College of Forestry at Syracuse University, 1944–51
 Hardy L. Shirley, Dean, State University College of Forestry at Syracuse University, 1952–67
 Edwin C. Jahn, Dean, State University College of Forestry at Syracuse University, 1967–69

Presidents 
 Edward E. Palmer, President, State University of New York College of Environmental Science and Forestry, 1969–83
 Ross S. Whaley, President, State University of New York College of Environmental Science and Forestry, 1984–99
 Cornelius B. Murphy, Jr., President, State University of New York College of Environmental Science and Forestry, 2000–13
 Quentin D. Wheeler, President, State University of New York College of Environmental Science and Forestry, 2014–18
 David C. Amberg, Interim President, State University of New York College of Environmental Science and Forestry, 2018 – May 31, 2020
 Joanne M. Mahoney, President, State University of New York College of Environmental Science and Forestry, November 4, 2020 – present

Officers in charge 

 Joseph L. Rufo, Officer in Charge, State University of New York College of Environmental Science and Forestry, June 1, 2020 – November 4, 2020

See also 
 State University of New York

References

Notes

Further reading 
 Canham, Hugh O. 2011. "SUNY-ESF: 100 Years and Going Strong"

New York State College of Forestry